Giona may refer to:
Giona (given name)
Mount Giona, a mountain in Phocis, Central Greece
Giona, Xanthi, a settlement in the Xanthi regional unit, Greece
Giona (river),  a stream which rises on the slopes of Monte Tamaro, in the Swiss canton of Ticino, and flows into the Italian Lake Maggiore
Budesonide, by its trade name Giona